Cairahuiri (possibly from Aymara and Quechua k'ayra frog) is a mountain in the Chila mountain range in the Andes of Peru, about  high. It is situated in the Arequipa Region, Caylloma Province, Tapay District. Cairahuiri lies southwest of Minasnioc, northwest of Surihuiri and Minaspata, northeast of Huaillaccocha and west of Huallatane. It stretches along the Cairahuiri River whose waters flow to the Molloco River in the west, a right affluent of the Colca River.

References 

Mountains of Peru
Mountains of Arequipa Region